Tamnan Krasue/Demonic Beauty (also Tamnan Krasue) is a 2002 Thai supernatural horror film written and directed by Bin Banluerit. The film concerns the krasue ghost legend that is common in Southeast Asian countries.

Plot
The Thai have defeated the Khmer Empire in the mid-18th century and taken the lovely Princess Tarawatee prisoner. Seeing her beauty, the Thai ruler weds her, but then later sees her in the arms of another man. He sentences them both to death – one through beheading and the other to be burnt to death. While waiting for her execution, the Princess hears from a fellow inmate that in a small village not too far away lives a young woman called Daow who is her exact physical double. As flames start to burn around her, the Princess sends her spirit to inhabit the body of Daow, but just as her spirit zips off to find her double, Daow is killed by a magical spell. In this manner the spirit ends up inhabiting a deceased body that soon springs to life to everyone's amazement. The body is now partly Daow's but also partly a vengeful ghost. Daow leads a normal life during the day, but at night a voracious greed overcomes her and she desperately needs to feed on blood and entrails. Thus her head slips away from the body to satisfy her insatiable hunger. This soon causes consternation among the villagers.

See also
List of ghost films

References

External links
 Tamnan Krasue - Constructing a Khmer Ghost for a Thai Film
 

2002 films
Thai ghost films
Thai horror films
Thai-language films
Thai supernatural horror films
Khmer-language films
Sahamongkol Film International films